Lewis Owen may refer to:

Lewis ab Owen (died 1555), Chamberlain of North Wales, Sheriff and MP for Merioneth
Lewis ab Owen ap Meurig (died 1590), Sheriff and MP for Anglesey
Lewis Owen (Merioneth MP, died 1692) (died 1692), barrister and MP for Merioneth in 1659
Lewis Owen, Custos Rotulorum of Merionethshire in 1722

See also
Owen Lewis (disambiguation)
Louis Owens